Kitaa, originally Vestgrønland ("West Greenland"), is a former administrative division of Greenland. It was by far the most populated of the divisions, being home to almost 90% of the total population. The divisions were de facto replaced by statistical regions after Greenland received home rule in 1979.

It is bordered in the west by the Baffin Bay, Davis Strait, Labrador Sea and the North Atlantic Ocean. To the east lies Tunu.

All but three of the island territory's municipalities were located in West Greenland. These were (in geographical order, from south to north):
 Nanortalik
 Qaqortoq
 Narsaq
 Ivittuut
 Paamiut
 Nuuk
 Maniitsoq
 Sisimiut
 Kangaatsiaq
 Aasiaat
 Qasigiannguit
 Ilulissat
 Qeqertarsuaq
 Uummannaq
 Upernavik

See also
 Subdivisions of Norden
 Administrative divisions of Greenland
 Isua greenstone belt (geology)

Counties of Greenland
Baffin Bay
2008 disestablishments in Greenland